Gwar is an American heavy metal band from Richmond, Virginia. Formed in 1985, the group's core thematic and visual concept revolves around an elaborate science fiction-themed mythology, which portrays each of the band members as barbaric interplanetary warriors. The band's original lineup featured vocalist Ben Eubanks (as the character of Johnny Slutman), guitarists Dave Brockie (Oderus Urungus), Russ Bahorsky (Mr. Magico) and Steve Douglas (Jaws of Death), bassist Chris Bopst (Balsac), and drummer Sean Sumner (Hans Sphincter). 

As of Brockie's death in 2014, Gwar currently features no original members, with a lineup of rhythm guitarist Mike Derks (Balsac the Jaws of Death, since 1988), drummer Brad Roberts (Jizmak Da Gusha, since 1989), lead guitarist Brent Purgason (Pustulus Maximus, since 2012), lead vocalist Mike Bishop (Blöthar the Berserker, since 2014; previously a bassist for the band), and bassist Casey Orr (Beefcake the Mighty, most recently since 2019).

History

1985–1987
Gwar was originally formed as a "joke band" under the name Gwaaarrrgghhlllgh by members of Richmond-based hardcore punk group Death Piggy, serving as the opening act at the band's live shows. According to co-founder Dave Brockie, early performances featured "a mish-mash of Death Piggy and Alter Natives musicians". Gwaaarrrgghhlllgh debuted on March 25, 1985 in its original form, with the "first real GWAR show with plot characters" following in October. 

The lineup for the first two shows featured lead vocalist Ben Eubanks (Johnny Slutman), guitarists Brockie (Oderus Urungus), Russ Bahorsky (Mr. Magico) and Steve Douglas (Jaws of Death), bassist Chris Bopst (Balsac) and drummer Sean Sumner. Eubanks, Bahorsky, Douglas and Sumner all left after the first two shows.

Returning later in 1985, Gwar featured a lineup of Brockie and Bopst alongside new vocalist Joe Annaruma (Joey Slutman), guitarists Greg Ottenger (Cornelius Carnage) and Ron Curry (Stephen Sphincter), and drummer Jim Thomson (Hans Sphincter); this core lineup was often joined live by Hunter Jackson (Techno Destructo) and Mike Delaney (The Executioner) on backup vocals. 

Early demo recordings from this lineup were eventually issued as part of the 2004 collection Let There Be Gwar. In 1986, Annaruma left after allegedly "trying to fuck Techno's girlfriend, The Temptress", with Brockie taking over the role of Gwar's lead vocalist. The band played one show with guitarist Tim Harriss playing "an unnamed character with a big headdress and a spiked tail", before settling on a two-guitarist lineup.

1987–1992
In early 1987, Ottinger, Bopst and Thomson all left Gwar, after their main band Alter Natives signed with SST Records. Hunter Jackson, founder of Slave Pit Inc. and designer of the band's original costumes, had also moved away, which led to the introduction of Dave Musel in his place. Brockie, along with satellite members Don Drakulich (Sleazy P. Martini), Mike Delaney (The Executioner) and Chuck Varga (The Sexecutioner), then rebuilt the band with the addition of guitarist Dewey Rowell and drummer Rob Mosby from local group White Cross, as well as returning guitarist Steve Douglas and new bassist Mike Bishop. New characters were also created – Flattus Maximus for Rowell, Balsac the Jaws of Death for Douglas, Beefcake the Mighty for Bishop and Nippleus Erectus for Mosby.

The lineup of Brockie, Rowell, Douglas, Bishop and Mosby recorded Gwar's debut album Hell-O, which was released in 1988. During a subsequent tour, Douglas left the band due to personal differences with Bishop, as well as his continued presence in multiple bands. The guitarist was replaced by Mike Derks, who took over the character of Balsac the Jaws of Death. The group continued touring until early 1989, when Mosby also left following a string of "sexual indiscretions" and creative differences. He was replaced by Pete Luchter (Lee Beato), who remained for a short time before leaving after being subjected to what Brockie described as "a brutal hazing ritual".

After the departures of Hosby followed by Luchter, Gwar completed a 1989 tour with former drummer Lee Thomson, this time as the character Hans Orifice. Brad Roberts took over later in the year as Jizmak da Gusha, in time for the recording of the band's second album Scumdogs of the Universe. After a lengthy touring cycle, Rowell left in 1991 and was not immediately replaced. Instead, Derks was aided for the recording of America Must Be Destroyed by session guitarists Tim Harriss and Brian Fechino, and for the start of the subsequent touring cycle by Barry Ward.

1992–2011
Following the release and initial promotion of America Must Be Destroyed, a permanent replacement for Dewey Rowell was found in Pete Lee, who took on the vacated role of Flattus Maximus. During the recording of the band's next album This Toilet Earth in April 1993, Lee was shot in the stomach when he got out of the band's van to investigate a robbery going on in front of them. He eventually recovered and returned to the band, several months later. Shortly thereafter, in late 1993, Bishop left Gwar, citing an anxiety disorder and interpersonal problems with bandmates, especially Lee, as reasons for his departure. Casey Orr took his place in February 1994.

With Lee and Orr in the lineup, Gwar released Ragnarök in 1995 and Carnival of Chaos in 1997, before Lee was forced to leave at the end of 1997 due to continuing health problems caused by the 1993 shooting. After Orr also left early the next year to return home to Texas, the remaining trio of Brockie, Derks and Roberts began to work on writing material for the band's next release We Kill Everything, before Bishop and Tim Harriss both returned to the group for the recording of the album.

Before the release of We Kill Everything, Orr returned to Gwar and Harriss was replaced by Zach Blair. Just one album came from the lineup, 2001's Violence Has Arrived, before both Blair and Orr left in the summer of 2002, and were replaced in September by Cory Smoot and Todd Evans, respectively. After releasing two studio albums – War Party in 2004 and Beyond Hell in 2006 – Evans left Gwar in April 2008 to focus on his other group Mobile Deathcamp, in which he performs lead vocals and his favoured instrument, guitar. Two weeks later, it was announced by guitarist Mike Derks that Casey Orr would return in Evans' place for his third tenure with the group.

Since 2011
After a three-year spell spawning the albums Lust in Space and Bloody Pit of Horror, bassist Casey Orr left Gwar for a third time to focus on his bands in his home state of Texas, primarily Rigor Mortis. In October, Jamison Land was announced as the new Beefcake the Mighty. The following month, however, lead guitarist Cory Smoot was found dead during a North American tour. The cause of death was revealed in December to have been coronary thrombosis, caused by his pre-existing coronary artery disease. 

The group continued the tour following Smoot's death, with Brockie explaining that "Although the great temptation would be to return home, curl into a fetal position, and mourn, we can't do that. First off, Cory wouldn't want that. He would want us to go on and would be pissed if we didn't. Plus we know the fans don't want us to quit. They are going to want a chance to come to grips with their loss, and there is no better place to do that than at a Gwar show."

Gwar returned to its five-piece lineup in August 2012 with the addition of Cannabis Corpse guitarist Brent Purgason, who took on the new character of Pustulus Maximus after Flattus was retired following Smoot's death. He debuted on Battle Maximus, which was released the following September. The album proved to be the last for Gwar's sole constant member Dave Brockie, who died on March 23, 2014. It was announced later that the cause of the singer's death was an accidental heroin overdose.

In August 2014, Gwar returned at its annual Gwar-B-Q festival, performing with former bassist Mike Bishop in the new character of Blöthar the Berserker on lead vocals. Bishop was later joined by Kim Dylla, serving as another new character called Vulvatron, as the band's second lead vocalist. She lasted only a few months, however, and it was announced the following May that she had left the band, with Purgason claiming that "Kim did a great job, but we wanted to go a different direction with the Vulvatron character. You will absolutely see more of Vulvatron in the future, just not portrayed by Kim. There is no ill will, no acrimony, and no drama ... it just isn't what we needed in the character."

Gwar released its first album since Brockie's death and Bishop's return, The Blood of Gods, in October 2017. In February 2019, bassist Land announced that he had left Gwar to return to his home state of Kentucky, in order to "spend more time with family and to focus on [his] driving career". When the band announced its Use Your Collusion Tour a few months later, it was revealed that Casey Orr had returned for his fourth tenure as Beefcake the Mighty.

Core band members

Current

Former

Supporting personnel

Current

Former

Timeline

Lineups

References

External links
Gwar official website
Slave Pit Inc. official website

Gwar